Road to Revolution: A Century of Russian Radicalism is a 1957 book by Avrahm Yarmolinsky on 19th century Russian radicalism.

References

External links 

 

1957 non-fiction books
English-language books